Argishti I, was the sixth known king of Urartu, reigning from 786 BC to 764 BC. He founded the citadel of Erebuni in 782 BC, which is the present capital of Armenia, Yerevan. Alternate transliterations of the name include Argishtis, Argisti, Argišti, and Argishtish. Although the name is usually rendered as Argišti (read: Argishti), some scholars argue that Argisti is the most likely pronunciation. This is due to the belief that the Urartians used the cuneiform symbol š to voice an s-sound, as opposed to representing the digraph sh.

A son and the successor of Menua, he continued the series of conquests initiated by his predecessors, apparently campaigning every year of his reign. He was involved in a number of inconclusive conflicts with the Assyrian king Shalmaneser IV. He conquered the northern part of Syria and made Urartu the most powerful state in post-Hittite Asia Minor. He also expanded his kingdom north to Lake Sevan, conquering much of Diauehi and the Ararat Valley. After an uprising by the inhabitants of the newly conquered regions, Argishti deported them and repopulated the area with subjects from other parts of his empire. In those territories, Argishti built Erebuni Fortress in 782 BC, settling it with 6,600 prisoners of war from Hatti and Supani. He also founded the fortress of Argishtikhinili in 776 BC, on the site of Armavir, the first capital of the later Kingdom of Armenia.

He was succeeded by his son Sarduri II.

Linguists believe that the name Argishti has Indo-European etymology (Armenian). Compare Armenian արեգ (translit. areg) – “sun deity”, “sun”  ΑΡΕJΑΣΤΙΝ (translit. Areyastin) - “epithet of the great mother”  and Ancient Greek αργεστής (translit. argestes) - “shining”, “brilliant”, “white”, “bright”. Ti (Di) meant "god" in proto-Armenian (compare with Classical Armenian Dik''').

See also

 List of kings of Urartu

References

Further reading
N. Adontz, Histoire d'Arménie. Les origines'', Paris, 1946

External links
 Erebouni at Armenica.org
 Erebuni - Cuneiform Foundations

Urartian kings
8th-century BC rulers
City founders
Yerevan